Time to Kill is an American mystery film directed by Herbert I. Leeds. It is
the first screen adaptation of Raymond Chandler's novel The High Window, which was remade five years later as The Brasher Doubloon.  The detective was changed from Philip Marlowe to Michael Shayne for this version, with Lloyd Nolan playing the part and Heather Angel in a rare turn as leading lady.  It is also the final Michael Shayne film starring Lloyd Nolan made at Fox, who closed down their popular B movie unit which included Mr. Moto, Charlie Chan, and the Cisco Kid. In 1946 the series would be reborn at Producers Releasing Corporation with Hugh Beaumont taking over the role.

Cast
In order of billing:
Lloyd Nolan as Michael Shayne
Heather Angel as Myrle Davis
Doris Merrick as Linda Conquest Murdock
Ralph Byrd as Lou Venter, bodyguard
Richard Lane as Lt. Breeze
Sheila Bromley as Lois Morny
Morris Ankrum as Alexander Morny
Ethel Griffies as Mrs. Murdock
James Seay as Leslie Murdock
Ted Hecht as George Anson Phillips
William Pawley as Mr. Hensch
Syd Saylor as The Mailman
Lester Sharpe as Elisha Washburn
Charles Williams as The Dentist
LeRoy Mason as Rudolph, the headwaiter
George Melford as Minor Role (uncredited)

Production

Rights
20th Century Fox bought Raymond Chandler's novel The High Window for $3,500. RKO Pictures purchased the rights to Chandler's 1940 novel Farewell, My Lovely and made 1944's Murder, My Sweet which would have the character of Philip Marlowe.

Score
David Raksin was uncredited for his work on Time to Kill although the book Film Composers in America : A Filmography, 1911-1970 credits him. Emil Newman is credited with the film score of Superior "Michael Shayne" thrillers: Murders surround theft of valuable coin.

Screenplay
Time to Kill was written by Clarence Upson Young, based on Raymond Chandler's novel The High Window. Brett Halliday wrote a series of books with Michael Shayne as the lead character whereas Chandler's was Philip Marlowe. 20th Century Fox was looking for detective film series after the success of Charlie Chan and Mr. Moto film series in 1940.

Cinematography
Time to Kills cinematographer was Charles Clarke.

Reception

Critical response
In 1978's The Detective in Hollywood by Jon Tuska claimed it "is in every way superior to the later remake, The Brasher Doubloon".

References

Citations

Sources

External links

Review of film at Variety

1942 films
1940s mystery drama films
20th Century Fox films
American detective films
American mystery drama films
Films based on American novels
American black-and-white films
Films based on works by Raymond Chandler
Films directed by Herbert I. Leeds
Films scored by David Raksin
Films scored by Emil Newman
1942 drama films
1940s American films